Naghan Rural District is in Naghan District of Kiar County, Chaharmahal and Bakhtiari province, Iran. At the census of 2006, its population was 3,286 in 739 households, when it was in Ardal County. There were 3,060 inhabitants in 783 households at the following census of 2011, by which time it was in the newly established Kiar County. At the most recent census of 2016, the population of the rural district was 2,739 in 813 households. The largest of its 24 villages was Adelabad, with 525 people.

References 

Kiar County

Rural Districts of Chaharmahal and Bakhtiari Province

Populated places in Chaharmahal and Bakhtiari Province

Populated places in Kiar County